Kalapahar, Manipur in North East India falls under Kangpokpi District, previously Senapati District and is 40 km north of Imphal, and it is connected through NH -2. Kangpokpi which is the District HQ is just 5 km away from Kalapahar. Kalapahar is mainly inhabited by the Gorkhas. It is connected to Haipi village, Tumnopokpi, Keithelmanbi, Liyai village, Mahika, Kharkhola, Mukuli and Chandraman. The village is over 200 yrs old and its inhabitants are mostly permanent citizens who are born and brought up there, as are their ancestors .
Kalapahar was once a garage during the British era and the remains can still be found in some areas. Earlier the place was also known as Workshop by British  and looking at the thick and dense jungle of Kalapahar, the Britishers used to call the place Kala Pahad meaning black forest and that is how "Kalapahar" got its name.

Population
The Lower Kalapahar village has population of 1725 of which 851 are males while 874 are females as per Population Census 2011.
The Upper Kalapahar village has population of 472 of which 261 are males while 211 are females as per Population Census 2011. 
2011 Indian Census
Kalapahar is sub divided into Lower Kalapahar, Middle Kalapahar & Upper Kalapahar.

Demographics and Culture
Kalapahar is mainly inhabited by Indian Gorkhas and a few other tribes. Nepali is the main language of the village. The cultures of the Meiteis and Gorkhas are similar. The main religion is Hinduism. There are two Hindu temples - Durga Bhawani mandir near DR Kharel English School and Shiva mandir at the bank of Kali River in Kalapahar. But there are also Christians, Buddhist and few of the Muslims. There is also a Poumai Naga Church close to the Shiva mandir. Kalapahar Bible Church near Galaxy Jr. High School and Anugrah Nepali Baptist Church are the two nepali Baptist church in the village. Most of the people are religiously tolerant and loves to enjoy all festivals, irrespective of religion. There are temples and churches in the area with freedom to follow any religion of choice. There is a Primary Health Center in the heart of the village with Doctor and Nurses available 24/7.

Panchayati Raj system, a local self-governing body prevalent a few years ago has been suspended.

There are a couple of schools in the area, a government school - The Kalapahar Gorkha High School which is the only Govt High School in the village and many other primary schools like UJB school, Upper Kalapahar, Chandraman School etc. The  private schools are the DR Kharel English Jr. High School now known as (Vidya Bharati DR Kharel Bal Vidya Mandir), Livingstone High School, Little Star and Galaxy Jr high school. The literacy rate of the village is approx 80% equally with male and female. Most of the youngster prefer joining the Army as their career and the trend of working abroad has just begun a decade ago. Only few of the youngster opt for self-reliant businesses.

The place is inhabited by peace-loving Gorkha society, who have been dwelling in the area since long time. The nearby location to Kalapahar is the Military colony or Keithelmanbi, which is inhabited by the Kuki tribes and on the other side is the Tumnopokpi and Yaikongpao- inhabited by the Thangal Nagas. After the removal of Panchayati system, Kalapahar's administration comes under Autonomous District Council, Kangpokpi and has one elected MDC along with one nominated MDC from Kalapahar as of present. Kalapahar also has various local clubs like Sunrise Gorkha Youth Club, Upper Kalapahar Youth Club etc. and the oldest among all is the Kalapahar Gorkha Youth Association registered in 1971-72 under registration number 1191. The main income source of the area is Agriculture. Paddy is the main source of food and vegetables of all kinds are found in the area.

Means of transportation in the area are Auto rickshaw, Mini Bus, hiring vans & cars. The nearest airport Bir Tikendrajit International Airport, Imphal is located around 50 km away and the nearest railway station is Dimapur which is around 170 km away.

Geography
Kharkhola, Mukuli, Santolabari, and Koubruleikha all neighboring area of Kalapahar. It lies in the Kangpokpi District. Kalapahar is surrounded by four rivers on each side -namely Kharkhola and setikhola on one side, Kalikhola & Gangakhola  on the other two sides with mountains all around. The village is located in a unique place that looks like a plateau and is self-sufficient for simple livelihood. The place is very fertile and different types of crops and vegetations can easily be cultivated. The weather of Kalapahar is pleasant all throughout the year and winters are cold. It is a beautiful place and the center of trade for the Gorkhas and all tribes, Naga, Kuki, Meitei, etc.

Kalapahar Bazar is the place for Thursday market, which is very famous in the area and is over hundred years old. It started long ago by ancestors to sell their home-based products and is still ongoing, where people of different ethnicity comes to trade, fresh fruits, vegetables, livestock, clothing's, cookery items etc. etc. Thursday market has lots of hustle justle during the festive periods in which footfalls are quite high.

It is also a place where rice beers and the local wine called Sekmai, are found in abundance, people from all area come to enjoy the tasty rice beer.

The people of Kalapahar are immensely talented in all forms of arts like dancing, singing etc. The Khukuri dance is a trademark and signature dance of Kalapahar and the dance troupes are invited to perform in various parts of the states. Kalapahar has produced many armed forces personnels and majority of the youths join the army, air force and navy due to their patriotic nature. Kalapahar also has many officers in the army, air force, Assam Rifles etc.

It is one of the most beautiful place in Manipur and is well bestowed by mother nature. There are various festivals which are celebrated with great pomp and fervor like Holi, Teez festival, Janmastami, Durga Puja, Diwali and Christmas. During Durga Puja and Diwali, every people who are abroad or outside Kalapahar returns home to celebrate with their family and Kalapahar is quite lively and jostling during festivities. The view of a Kalapahar during diwali when every houses  lights candles, diyas and electric light is a view to behold. People from different parts of Manipur come to Kalapahar to celebrate different festivals as the people are quite welcoming and humble...

Some Firsts in Kalapahar 

1. 1st Matriculate from Kalapahar- Shri Subol Singh Mohotey

2. 1st PU( Class 12) : Shri Subol Singh Mohotey

3. 1st Pradhan of Kalapahar Gram Panchayat - Shri Devi prasad Baskota (Mukhiya)

4. 1st Elected Member of District Council (MDC) - Shri Kishore Thapa

5. 1st Member of Legislative Assembly (MLA) :  Shri Kishor Thapa

6. 1st Armed Forces Officers( JCO or  Honorary) : Honorary Lieutenant Shri Nar Bahadur Adhikari

7. 1st Commissioned Armed Forces Officer -Major  Dhurba Sigdyal (MUKULI)

Assam Rifles - 2 i/c Shri Hemsagar Uprety

8. 1st Civil Service Officer: IGP Shri CP Giri (IPS)

9. 1st Pandit (with Temple name) -Shri Narayan Neupane (Upper kalapahar temple shifted from Burma)

10. 1st Pastor- Shri James Shah Shankar

11. 1st Club President and Secretary - Shri Krishna Bdr.Thapa and Shri Chandra Prasad (CP) Giri

12. 1st Mahila Mandal President and Secretary - Smt. Krishna kumari Adhikari and Smt. Babita koirala (Regd.in 1989)

13. 1st Doctorate -Shri Saran Rizal(Agriculture Dept)

14. 1st Bank Manager - Shri Subol Singh Mohotey

15. 1st Manager in Pharma Company - Shri Chandan Adhikari

16. 1st Headmaster of DR Kharel School : Sir Arjun Pradhan

17. 1st Headmaster of Galaxy school : Sir Arjun Pradhan

18. 1st Headman of Kalapahar Village - Shri Purna Singh

19. Ist Vice Chairman Autonomous District Council  -  Padam Prasad Kharel

References

http://www.fallingrain.com/world/IN/17/Kalapahar.html
http://www.maplandia.com/india/manipur/senapati/kalapahar/

http://www.thesangaiexpress.com/4447-the-truth-about-gorkhas-in-manipur/
http://www.ceomanipur.nic.in/ElectoralRolls/Roll_English/A050/A0500031.pdf

Villages in Kangpokpi district